Pyongyang station is the central railway station of P'yŏngyang, North Korea. It is located in Yŏkchŏn-dong, Chung-guyŏk.

Main information
The station is the start of the P'yŏngbu and P'yŏngŭi lines, which were adjusted from the Kyŏngbu and Kyŏngŭi lines used before the division of Korea to accommodate the shift of the capital from Seoul to P'yŏngyang. The P'yŏngŭi Line runs from P'yŏngyang to Sinŭiju, while the P'yǒngbu Line theoretically runs through Seoul and ends at Busan; in practice, however, the line ends at Kaesǒng. It is also served by the P'yǒngnam Line, which runs from P'yŏngyang to Namp'o, as well as the P'yŏngdŏk Line running from P'yŏngyang to Kujang.

Connections
 
P'yŏngyang station is the main station in North Korea and it connects most of the cities of the country: Chŏngju, Sinŭiju, Namp'o, Sariwŏn, Kaesŏng, Wŏnsan, Hamhŭng and Rason. Beside domestic routes, international trains link Pyongyang with the Chinese capital Beijing four times weekly (24 hours) and the Chinese city of Dandong, located on the adjacent bank of the Yalu River. Trains do connect Pyongyang with Moscow, however due to chronic delays these are off-limits to foreigners.

Local transit connections can be made at the station via Pyongyang Metro's Yǒngwang station (on the Ch'ŏllima Line), by Line 1 of the P'yŏngyang tram system and Pyongyang trolleybus lines 1, 2 and 10, with Pyongyang station being the terminus of all three lines.

Structure

The original station was constructed in the 1920s by the Empire of Japan who occupied Korea at the time, the original architectural style being akin to the original Seoul station built at a similar time, with the two cities once linked together. During the Korean War, the original structure was destroyed and later on rebuilt in 1958 in the style of socialist architecture. The station presently has three floors above ground level as well as a basement. The ground level houses a ticket desk exclusively for government employees. At the first floor there is a waiting room, toilets, a ticket desk and access to the trains. At the second floor there are offices for the staff and at the third the office of the station master. There are five platforms, with number 1 being the most spacious.

Speaker system

At 6am every day, a rendition of "Where Are You, Dear General?" is played over a speaker system at the station. Some think the song may be intended as a morning alarm call for local residents.

References

External links
 Introduction of Pyongyang Station 

Railway stations in North Korea
Buildings and structures in Pyongyang
Transport in Pyongyang
Railway stations opened in 1906
1906 establishments in Korea